Mount Watt is a peak, 2,715 m, located 3 nautical miles (6 km) northwest of Mount Roy in the Barker Range, Victoria Land. Named by the Southern Party of the New Zealand Federated Mountain Clubs Antarctic Expedition (NZFMCAE), 1962–63, after B.H. Watt, expedition secretary.

Mountains of Victoria Land
Pennell Coast